Funing County is under the administration of Yancheng, Jiangsu province, China. The county borders the prefecture-level city of Huai'an to the west. It has a population of 1.08 million, with 180,000 in the urban area, and a jurisdiction area of 1,436 km2. It is under the jurisdiction of Yancheng municipality. The county was incorporated in 1731. Its seat of government is located at Fucheng Town. Funing is a 400-km drive from Shanghai via the G15 Expressway.

Funing is famous for being a revolutionary area of the Chinese Communist Party.

It is also home to the Jiangsu Funing Economic Development Zone.

Administrative divisions
In the present,Funing County has 20 towns. 
20 towns

Climate

See also
 Funing big cake

References

External links
Funing Government website
Funing County English guide (Jiangsu.NET)

County-level divisions of Jiangsu
Yancheng